Halltown is an unincorporated community on land that was originally owned by William Hall along Flowing Springs Run in Jefferson County, West Virginia.  Halltown is located off U.S. Route 340 on West Virginia Route 230 between Charles Town and Bolivar. A few houses, a fork in the road, a tiny post office, and the large Halltown Paper Plant are the distinguishing features of the community.

History
The community was named after the Hall family, owners of a farm near the town site. In October 1896, the area surrounding Halltown was one of three areas in the U.S. – the others being Charles Town and Uvilla – to begin Rural Free Delivery (RFD) service.

References

Unincorporated communities in Jefferson County, West Virginia
Unincorporated communities in West Virginia